"This Never Happened Before" is a song from Paul McCartney's 2005 album Chaos and Creation in the Backyard. It was released to radio stations in the United States in 2006, peaking at #27 on Billboard's Adult Contemporary chart (see 2006 in music). It was included in the soundtrack of the movie The Lake House (2006).

Track listing
Promo CD DPRO-49684-2
"This Never Happened Before" (edit 2) - 3:13
"This Never Happened Before" (album version) - 3:23

Personnel
Per booklet.
Paul McCartney – vocals, Yamaha grand piano, Höfner bass guitar, Epiphone Casino electric guitar, Ludwig drums
Millennia Ensemble – strings, brass
Joby Talbot – conducting, arrangement

References

External links
Official site
[ Paul McCartney: Artist Chart History]

Paul McCartney songs
2005 songs
Songs written by Paul McCartney
Song recordings produced by Nigel Godrich